Laughlintown is an unincorporated community in Ligonier Township, Westmoreland County, Pennsylvania, United States. Laughlintown has a post office with ZIP code 15655, which opened on May 16, 1825.

The Compass Inn, which is listed on the National Register of Historic Places, is located in Laughlintown. Also the Rolling Rock Club and The Washington Furnace Inn is located in Laughlintown.

Laughlintown has a population of 332, according to the most recent U.S. census.

Notes

Unincorporated communities in Westmoreland County, Pennsylvania
Unincorporated communities in Pennsylvania